Howard P. Kainz (born 1933) is professor emeritus at Marquette University, Milwaukee. He was a recipient of a National Endowment for the Humanities fellowship for 1977-1978, and Fulbright fellowships in Germany for 1980-1981 and 1987-1988. Kainz advocates aspects of the philosophy of G.W.F. Hegel.

Kainz is a founding member of the Hegel Society of America.

Books
His major publications include "Active and Passive Potency" in Thomistic Angelology (1972); Hegel's Phenomenology, Part I: Analysis and Commentary (1976); Ethica Dialectica: A Study of Ethical Oppositions (1979); The Philosophy of Man (1981); Hegel's Phenomenology, Part II: The Evolution of Ethical and Religious Consciousness to the Absolute Standpoint (1983); Philosophical Perspectives on Peace (1987); Ethics in Context: Toward the Definition and Differentation of the Morally Good (1988); Paradox, Dialectic, and System: A Reconstruction of the Hegelian Problematic (1988); Democracy and the "Kingdom of God" (1993); Hegel's Phenomenology of Spirit: Selections Translated and Annotated by Howard P. Kainz (1994); An Introduction To Hegel: The Stages Of Modern Philosophy (1996); GWF Hegel: The Philosophical System (1996); Politically Incorrect Dialogues (1999); Natural Law: an Introduction and Reexamination (2004); and The Philosophy of Human Nature (2008) and The Existence of God and the Faith-Instinct (2010). His Paradox, Dialectic, and System received the Choice Distinguished Scholarly Book award for 1988.

References

Living people
American philosophy academics
Hegelian philosophers
20th-century American philosophers
21st-century American philosophers
1933 births